Soul Witness is a collaborative studio album, by Australian musicians Matt Walker with Ashley Davies, released in July 2000. At the ARIA Music Awards of 2000, the album won the ARIA Award for Best Blues and Roots Album.

Track listing
 CD1
 "Deepest Valley" - 3:08
 "You Put a Spell On Me" - 5:04
 "Black Rose" - 4:43
 "Green & Grey" - 5:43
 "Dirty Fog" -	6:32
 "Victims Highway"	- 4:30
 "In the Undertow"	- 2:31
 "Train Driver" - 3:51
 "Evil Feelings" - 5:01
 "Room to Move" - 6:04
 "Second Hand Luck" - 6:00
 "Party Town" - 3:12

 CD2 (Live At The Continental)
 "Don't Need Sunshine"
 "Deepest Valley" (Live)
 "Dirty Fog" (Live)
 "Room to Move" (Live)
 "This Broken Sky" (Live)
 "Second Hand Luck" (Live)
 'All By Myself" (Live)

References

2000 albums
Collaborative albums
ARIA Award-winning albums